The  figurine, also called the Lion-man of , is a prehistoric ivory sculpture discovered in Hohlenstein-Stadel, a German cave in 1939. The German name, meaning "lion-person" or "lion-human", is used most frequently because it was discovered and is exhibited in Germany.

Determined by carbon dating of the layer in which it was found to be between 35,000 and 41,000 years old, it is one of the oldest-known examples of an artistic representation and the oldest confirmed statue ever discovered. Its age associates it with the archaeological Aurignacian culture of the Upper Paleolithic. An example of zoomorphic art, it was carved out of mammoth ivory using a flint stone knife. Seven parallel, transverse, carved gouges are on the left arm.

It currently is displayed in the Museum Ulm, in the town of Ulm.

History
Systematic excavations at Hohlenstein-Stadel cave began in 1937 under the direction of historian Robert Wetzel. The discovery of a fragmented mammoth ivory figurine was made on 25 August 1939 by geologist Otto Völzing. The start of World War II just one week later meant that the fieldwork was left incomplete and analysis of the finds was not undertaken. The excavation trenches were back-filled with the same soil in which the ivory had been found. For approximately thirty years, the fragments lay forgotten at the nearby Museum Ulm. It was not until archaeologist Joachim Hahn started an inventory and assembly of more than 200 fragments that a figurine with animal and human features began to emerge.

Wetzel continued to spend summers digging at the site until 1961, and further finds of ivory were made on the cave floor in the 1970s. In 1982, paleontologist Elisabeth Schmid combined the new fragments with Hahn's reconstruction, correcting some errors and adding pieces of the nose and mouth that emphasized the figurine's feline characteristics.

In 1987, a comprehensive restoration began in the workshops of the Landesmuseum Württemberg by Ute Wolf in cooperation with Schmid. During the work, which took more than six months, it was realized that the figurine was only about two-thirds complete. The back was severely damaged and the legs were missing some ivory lamellae. The ears, eye-holes, two-thirds of the mouth and nose, and the back of the head were preserved. To fill gaps in the head and body a reversible substance consisting of a mixture of beeswax, artificial wax, and chalk was used.

From 2008, further excavations were carried out in the cave. All layers were sifted systematically, which led to many minute fragments being discovered. The first new adjustments were simulated virtually so that fragments could be added without having to disassemble the original recreation.

In 2012, a second restoration was begun in the workshops of the State Office for the Preservation of Historical Monuments in Esslingen under the leadership of Nicole Ebinger-Rist. The figurine was disassembled into its individual parts and newly discovered fragments were added along with the old ones, allowing further completion of areas of the head, back, and right side of the body, and artificial additions used during the first restoration were discarded. The Löwenmensch figurine grew in height from 296 to 311 millimetres. Work was completed in late 2013.

Interpretation
Some researchers have ascribed sexual characteristics to the object. Initially, the figurine was classified as male by Hahn who suggested a plate on the abdomen could be a flaccid penis. Male European cave lions often lacked distinctive manes, so the absence of a mane could not determine categorically that the figurine was that of a lioness, and a debate about its sex ensued among some involved in the research and the popular press. Kurt Wehrberger, of the Museum Ulm, stated that the statue had become an "icon of the feminist movement".

After the 2012–2013 restoration it was realized that the triangular platelet in the genital area was processed all around, separating it from the figurine. A fracture point suggests that originally it may have been square in shape, which most commonly could be interpreted as a stylized male sex organ. Debate continues, even though an objective determination of the sex of the Löwenmensch figurine may be impossible.

The Löwenmensch figurine lay in a chamber almost  from the entrance of the Stadel cave, accompanied by many other objects. Bone tools and worked antlers were found, along with jewellery consisting of pendants, beads, and perforated animal teeth. The chamber was probably a special place, possibly used as a storehouse, hiding-place, or maybe as an area for cultic rituals.

A similar but smaller lion-headed human figurine was found in Hohle Fels. Archaeologist Nicholas Conard suggested that "the occupants of Hohle Fels in the Ach Valley and Hohlenstein-Stadel in the Lone Valley must have been members of the same cultural group and shared beliefs and practices connected with therianthropic images of felids and humans" and that "the discovery of a second Löwenmensch lends support to the hypothesis that Aurignacian people practised a form of shamanism."

The figurine shares certain similarities with later French cave paintings, which also show hybrid creatures with human-like lower bodies and animal heads, such as the "Sorcerer" from the Trois Frères in the Pyrenees or the "Bison-man" from the Grotte de Gabillou in the Dordogne.

Debate exists as to whether the figurine depicts a lion or human-lion hybrid figure at all; with similarities to a standing bear, and the unreliable nature of the reconstructions cited.

Manufacture
The carving of the figurine from hard mammoth tusk would have been a complex and time-consuming task. A similarly sized tusk found in the same cave has marks that "indicate that the skin and thin bone around the tooth cavity of the upper jaw were cut through to the surface of the tooth, which was then exposed for detachment with a hammer. The tip was harder and had to be removed by wedging and splitting."

Wulf Hein and Kurt Wehrberger conducted an experimental replication with the kinds of stone tool available at the time. Removing the base of the tusk took ten hours. The body was carved with a steep-fronted scraper; the burins requiring regular resharpening. Several different tools were needed to separate the torso from the insides of the arms while shaping the head and shoulders, which involved difficult cutting across the grain of the ivory, often required two hands on the tool. The basic shaping took around 200 hours, and in total the recreation took more than 370 hours. Jill Cook, Curator of Palaeolithic collections at the British Museum, suggests that "unless the sculpture was created slowly at odd moments over several months, someone as skilled as an artist may have been excused from other subsistence tasks to work specially on this piece."

In his October 2017 BBC Radio 4 series Living with the Gods, Neil MacGregor asked Cook
... so why would a community living on the edge of subsistence, whose primary concerns were finding food, keeping that fire going, protecting children from predators, allow someone to spend so much time away from those tasks?

She replied that it was about
... a relationship to things unseen, to the vital forces of nature, that you need to perhaps propitiate, perhaps connect to, in order to ensure your successful life.

See also
General stone age art topics
 Art of the Upper Paleolithic
 List of Stone Age art
 Prehistoric art

Examples of zoomorphic stone age art
 Bird-man from Lascaux
 Bird-horse-man from Hornos de la Peña
 Vogelherd figurines
 Venus of Hohle Fels

Related ancient history lion-headed figures
 Arimanius – obscure lion-headed god in Mithraism
 Bastet – cat-headed goddess in Ancient Egypt (originally lion-headed)
 Sekhmet – lion-headed war goddess in Ancient Egypt
 Narasimha - lion-headed Hindu god, an avatar of  Vishnu.

Notes

References

Further reading
   museum edition:

External links

  — museum official Lion-Man website with information about the figurine
  — materials and photos of the figurine
  — showing the manufacture of a replica using authentic tools, in German with English subtitles
 

Archaeology of Germany
Archaeological discoveries in Germany
Prehistoric sculpture
Figurines
Anthropomorphic animals
Prehistoric art
Art of the Upper Paleolithic
Sculptures of lions
Swabian Jura
European archaeology
1939 archaeological discoveries
Ivory works of art